The 10th Central Committee of the Chinese Communist Party was in session from 1973 to 1977. It was preceded by the 9th Central Committee of the Chinese Communist Party.  It held three plenary sessions in the 4-year period.  It was formally succeeded by the 11th Central Committee of the Chinese Communist Party.

It elected the 10th Politburo of the Chinese Communist Party in 1973.

Chairman: Mao Zedong
Vice Chairmen: Zhou Enlai, Wang Hongwen, Kang Sheng, Ye Jianying, Li Desheng.

Members
Mao Zedong
The following is in stroke order of surnames:

Chronology
1st Plenary Session
Date: August 30, 1973
Location: Beijing
Significance: Mao Zedong was appointed Chairman of the CCP Central Committee, with Zhou Enlai, Wang Hongwen, Kang Sheng, Ye Jianying and Li Desheng as vice-chairmen. 25-member Politburo, 9-member Politburo Standing Committee and other central organs were elected.
2nd Plenary Session
Date: January 8–10, 1975
Location: Beijing
Significance: The only point in agenda was the preparation of the 4th National People's Congress, which was to open on January 13. The 1975 Constitution of the People's Republic of China as well as reports and lists of nominees for top State posts to be submitted to the Congress were approved. Deng Xiaoping was elected vice-chairman and Standing Committee member, replacing Li Desheng who resigned and disappeared from the public.
3rd Plenary Session
Date: July 16–21, 1977
Location: Beijing
Significance: Hua Guofeng was ratified as Chairman of the CCP Central Committee with the formal approval of the October 6, 1976 Politburo resolution. The Gang of Four was furtherly denounced and its members expelled from the Party. Deng Xiaoping was restored to all his posts after the Politburo had removed him from the core leadership in April 1976. The decision to convene the Party's 11th National Congress ahead of schedule was taken.

External links
 10th Central Committee of the CCP, People's Daily Online.

Central Committee of the Chinese Communist Party
1973 establishments in China
1977 disestablishments in China